The Golden Ball is a pub in the Bishophill area of central York, in England.

The first record of the pub was in 1773.  The core part of the building was constructed in the early 19th century.  In 1883, a house for the publican was constructed by Benson & Minks, adjoining the pub.  The pub was sold to Braime's Brewery in 1884, and this in 1902 was taken over by John Smith's Brewery.  In 1929, the pub was constructed by their architect Bertram Wilson.  He combined the two buildings, raised the ceiling height in the older part of the building, and decorated the front of the pub.

In the 1990s, an additional room was added to the pub, from what was formerly a private area.  The pub has otherwise been little altered since the 1920s, and is described by the Campaign for Real Ale (CAMRA) as "the most complete surviving inter-war scheme by John Smith's".  In 2010, the pub was grade II listed on the initiative of CAMRA, and it appears on that organisation's National Inventory of Historic Pub Interiors.

In 2012, the pub was taken over by a co-operative of local residents.  Since then, it has held beer festivals, an annual summer fete, and sells works by local artists.  It also hosts local music nights.

The pub has two storeys and a cellar.  The whole building is constructed of brick, but the older part, on the corner of Victor Street, has tiling at the ground floor level, and is rendered at the first floor.  Its entrance is on Cromwell Road, opening onto a corridor, with the former smoke bar on the left, and the public bar on the right.  Historic England notes that it has the only known surviving example of a "bar-side seating alcove", known as a "hall".  There is a now-disused doorway for take-away sales, signed "Jug & Bottle Dept".  The ground floor windows on Victor Street incorporate etched glass, advertising John Smiths and Magnet Ales.  Many internal fittings survive from the 1929 redesign, including doors, tiling, flooring, and the bar.

References

External links

Grade II listed pubs in York
National Inventory Pubs